The United States Military Training Mission (USMTM) to the Kingdom of Saudi Arabia is a Security Assistance Organization (SAO) which manages and is primarily funded by Foreign Military Sales (FMS) cases between the United States Government and the Kingdom of Saudi Arabia. USMTM was the result of a meeting between King Abdul Aziz and United States President Franklin D. Roosevelt at Great Bitter Lake.

Mission
USMTM coordinates security assistance efforts to train, advise, and assist the Saudi Arabian Armed Forces in building defense capacity/capability through military exercises and professional military education in order to promote regional security and to protect common interests of the United States of America and the Kingdom of Saudi Arabia while strengthening strategic partnership.

USMTM Goals

To maintain and enhance the strategic partnership between the KSA and the USA.

To train, advise, and assist the Saudi Arabian Armed Forces (SAAF) to:
 Develop and evolve strategic plans and policy.
 Conduct Joint and Coalition operations and exercises.
 Maintain interoperability among SAAF, the U.S., and mutual regional partners.
 Institutionalize the Professional Military Education program.
 Measure readiness for sustainment and modernization of the force.

USMTM is a Joint Command composed of officers and enlisted personnel from the Army, Navy, Air Force and Marine Corps. The head of USMTM carries the title of "Chief" and is also designated the senior U.S. Defense Representative (USDR) for the Kingdom of Saudi Arabia. USMTM is the primary liaison between U.S. Armed Forces and the Saudi Arabian Ministry of Defense and Aviation (MODA), the Saudi counterpart to the American Joint Chiefs of Staff.

Within USMTM there are six divisions, each who interfaces with a Saudi counterpart:
 Joint Advisory Division (JAD): interfaces with the Ministry of Defense and Aviation (MODA).
 Land Forces Division (LFD): interfaces with the Royal Saudi Land Forces (RSLF).
 Naval Forces Division (NFD): interfaces with the Royal Saudi Naval Forces (RSNF).
 Air Force Division (AFD): interfaces with the Royal Saudi Air Force (RSAF).
 Marine Forces Division (MFD): interfaces with the Royal Saudi Marine Forces (RSFMF) component of the Royal Saudi Naval Forces.
 Air and Missile Division (AMD): interfaces with the Royal Saudi Air Defense Forces (RSADF).

Chain of Command

USMTM is a joint training mission and functional component command under the military command of the USCENTCOM, MacDill Air Force Base, Florida. USMTM's mission is to advise and assist the Saudi Arabian armed forces through security cooperation efforts in developing, training and sustaining capable deterrent and self-defense forces for Saudi Arabia in
order to facilitate regional security.  The mission of USMTM directly supports USCENTCOM's theater strategy to shape, respond and prepare, through forward presence, bilateral and multilateral exercise programs, security assistance activities, and foreign military sales.

Both military and civilian personnel assigned to USMTM are under the sponsorship of the U.S. State Department and the Saudi Arabian Ministry Defense and Aviation and are classified as non-combatants under Title 22 of the United States Code.

History
The 1951 Mutual Defense Assistance Agreement and the 1977 Accords (known as the USMTM Agreement) formed and governs the basis and function of USMTM in Saudi Arabia. USMTM was formally established on 27 June 1953 and is still a fundamental component of the US/Saudi military relationship.

The Chiefs of USMTM

 (A) = Army, (AF) = Air Force, (USMC) = Marine Corps, (USSF) = Space Force

See also
 Dhahran Airfield
 Ministry of Defense and Aviation
 Office of the Program Manager, Saudi Arabian National Guard Modernization Program (OPM-SANG)
 Office of the Program Manager, Ministry of Interior Facility Security Forces (OPM-FSF)

References

Further reading
 The United States Military Training Mission (USMTM) to the Kingdom Of Saudi Arabia by Colonel Theodore C. Lockhart
 USMTM Fact Sheet Riyadh Kingdom of Saudi Arabia
 United States Military Training Mission: A Paradigm for Regional Security

External links
 Official Site
 Defense Security Cooperation Agency

Saudi Arabia–United States military relations
Commands of the United States Armed Forces
United States Security Assistance Organizations
Foreign Military Sales